Belgrave Edward Sutton Ninnis (22 June 1887 – 14 December 1912) was an English officer in the Royal Fusiliers and an Antarctic explorer who was a member of Douglas Mawson's 1911 Australasian Antarctic expedition.

Family
Ninnis was the son of British arctic explorer Belgrave Ninnis (1837–1922), Inspector Surgeon General of the Royal Navy and member of Captain Sir George Nares' British Arctic Expedition of 1875–1876. Ninnis' cousin, Aubrey Howard Ninnis (1883-1956) was also a part of the Heroic Age of Antarctic Exploration, having briefly been a part of the crew on board the Terra Nova before joining the Ross Sea party contingent of the Imperial Trans-Antarctic Expedition as a purser.

Antarctica, 1911–1912
Following the fame he achieved on Ernest Shackleton's 1907 Nimrod Expedition to Antarctica, Douglas Mawson travelled to England in early 1910 to raise interest and sponsorship for an Australian Expedition focussed on scientific outcomes. On that trip he purchased the whaler  and in London he loaded it with the many items of specialist equipment he was able to obtain there and 48 sledging dogs procured from Greenland. Ninnis joined the Expedition in London as a minder of the Greenland dogs, and sailed with the Aurora on its voyage from London to Sydney commanded by Captain John King Davis. On the trip Ninnis soon formed a close friendship with Dr. Xavier Mertz, a Swiss mountaineer who joined the Expedition in London and who was also appointed to handle the dogs. Ninnis wrote of his deep admiration for Mertz in his diary:

As time went on during the expedition, Ninnis would come to view Mertz as an older brother figure. Charles Laseron, the expedition's taxidermist, would write years later:

Ninnis was in the 36-man party who set sail from Hobart on 2 December 1911. A base was built at Macquarie Island and a small party of five men were deployed to man a radio relay station and to conduct research. Ninnis landed in Antarctica with the main party Commonwealth Bay on 8 January 1912, and established the Main Base. The summer was spent building a hut at Cape Denison for the 18 man Adelie Land base party to winter in. Ninnis and Mertz continued their jobs caring for the dogs once the hut was established. Both of the men would also be on a rotated schedule taking turns as cook and watchmen, respectively. Ninnis, in a diary entry dated 4 August 1912, detailed how he, along with Mertz, helped design a new type of harness for the dogs and intended to complete an appendix about "details of this and our other harnesses and dog matters." Ninnis, however, would never manage to complete his appendix before his untimely death months later. Ninnis, in his final diary entry on 9 November 1912, stated that:

Ninnis would eventually be selected to be a part of the three-man sledging team, the Far Eastern Party, together with Mawson and Mertz. The party left Cape Denison on 10 November 1912 to survey King George V Land. After three weeks of excellent progress the party was crossing the Ninnis Glacier, when Ninnis fell through a snow-covered crevasse. Mertz had skied over the crevasse lid, Mawson had been on his sled with his weight dispersed but Ninnis was jogging beside the second sled and his body weight is likely to have breached the lid. Six dogs, most of the party's rations, their tent and other essential supplies disappeared into a massive crevasse 480 km east of the main base. Mertz and Mawson spotted one dead and one injured dog on a ledge  down but Ninnis was not seen again. After calling Ninnis' name for three hours at the edge of the crevasse, Mawson and Mertz held a short memorial service for Ninnis. Mawson, and in particular Mertz, were devastated at the loss. Mertz would write in his sledging diary:

Without the extra food and supplies for the remaining men and dogs, the situation proved dire for both Mawson and Mertz. They had no choice but to retrace their journey back to Cape Denison. Mawson remarked in his diary: "9 hours after the accident, started back but terribly handicapped... May God help us."

Legacy
The lives of Ninnis, together with Mertz, are commemorated with two memorials. The first memorial is a wooden cross erected at Cape Denison by members of the Australasian Anatarctic Expedition as a tribute to both Ninnis and Mertz. The second memorial, unveiled in 2021, is located in Hobart, Tasmania. The memorial has been jointly funded by the UK government, the Swiss government and the Mawson's Huts Foundation. The members of the Australasian Antarctic Expedition spent some time in Hobart en route to Antarctica via Macquarie Island.

Ninnis' sword from the army, an Edward VII 1897 infantry officer's sword, was sold at auction in 2022 for £5,600.

References

Footnotes

Bibliography 

 Hall, Lincoln (2000) Douglas Mawson, The Life of an Explorer New Holland, Sydney

External links

 History of the 1911–12 Expedition
 Lieutenant Belgrave Ninnis & Dr Xavier Mertz – Monument Australia

1887 births
1912 deaths
Antarctic expedition deaths
Australasian Antarctic Expedition
Explorers of Antarctica
Graduates of the Royal Military College, Sandhurst
Royal Fusiliers officers